The Search for Santa Paws is a 2010 Christmas adventure fantasy film released on November 23, 2010. The film is the tenth film in the Air Bud franchise and is also a prequel to Santa Buddies, as well as a spin-off from the Air Buddies film franchise.

Plot
At the North Pole, while celebrating his birthday, Santa Claus receives a letter and gift from New York City, informing him of the passing of old friend and toy store owner Mr. Hucklebuckle, who was an ambassador for "The Santa Cause", an organization of delegates who embrace and encourage Christmas spirit around the world. To cheer Santa up, his head elf Eli uses the great Christmas icicle to bring the gift, a stuffed dog, to life. Santa names the puppy Paws and the two become best friends.

In New York, an orphan named Quinn arrives at the 64th Street Home For Girls, an orphanage run by Ms. Gladys Stout, a strict woman who disapproves of anything that the children love including Christmas decorations and toys which she often steals and throws them in her incinerator in the house's basement. Despite this Quinn befriends the other girls, including the oldest, Willamina "Will", who has lost her Christmas spirit since the death of her own parents when she was Quinn's age.

Meanwhile, Mr. Hucklebuckle's grandson James, a CPA from Los Angeles and his wife Kate arrive at his toy store and are informed by their caseworker Mr. Stewart that they must run the store profitably for one Christmas season in order to gain ownership. They decide to hire a store Santa to bring in customers, intending to sell the store once they have ownership.

Santa and Paws decide to travel to New York to visit Hucklebuckle's store, landing in Central Park gaining the attention of a homeless man named Gus who decides to follow them. On the streets, Santa bumps into Ms. Stout, falls into the street and is hit by a cab. Paws tries to ask for help, which leads to him and Santa getting separated. Santa's magical crystal is stolen by Gus. He recovers, but has amnesia, after spending the night wandering the streets he finds his way to Hucklebuckle Toys. James and Kate assuming he is an applicant take him in and give him a job as their store Santa. Santa introduces himself as "Bud" due to Gus referring to him by the name earlier.

After spending the night wandering the streets, Paws meets three stray dogs named Haggis, Rasta and T-Money who are captured by Franklin, a dogcatcher and Ms. Stout's boyfriend. Paws manages to create a diversion and uses the magic of his crystal rescue them from the truck. Grateful, they pledge their loyalty to him and vow to help him find Santa in hopes that they can get off of the naughty list.

Learning of the situation, Eli and his uncanny elf dog Eddy go to New York, where they recruit local Boy Scout Jimmy to help. Eventually, they find Gus and get him to return Santa's crystal to them. However, Santa soon lands back in the hospital after being without his crystal too long. Meanwhile, Paws meets Quinn and is secretly brought back to the orphanage, where he befriends the girls and uses his crystal's magic to give them Christmas cheer, including hobby horses, Christmas bedding, and even Christmas decor and dresses.

However, Ms. Stout discovers this and locks Paws and Will (who takes the fall for Quinn) in the basement, stealing Quinn's late mother's angel ornament (the last thing her mother gave her before her passing) and Paws's crystal. Will hears Paws speak and regains her Christmas spirit overnight, but without his crystal Paws reverts to stuffed animal form by the next morning. When Ms. Stout discovers this, she assumes Paws escaped and throws the toy into the incinerator (since she almost burned him) and the chase is on as she go on a date with Franklin. Eli told Janie to turn the power off as he is narrowly saved by Quinn before he can let him fall into the incinerator. They return Paws' crystal and restore him to life as Jimmy arrives and tells Eli that Santa is at Hucklebuckle Toys, Will and Quinn come along with Haggis, Rasta and T-Money. Eli tells Jimmy to keep the pin since he is an official Santa's helper now before Jimmy heads home.

Ms. Stout returns to the orphanage where she is met by Mrs. Gibson who informs her that she received a phone call from Eli that the girls were left alone and that Will and Quinn are missing. Ms. Stout is fired by court order and Mrs. Gibson takes over the orphanage.

After explaining the situation to everyone, Will and Quinn leave with them to help Santa. After arriving at the hospital and finding Santa near death, they reunite him with his crystal, but its magic has been too used up to work. Paws then sacrifices his crystal's magic to restore Santa's, reverting him to stuffed animal form once more while saving Santa's life. Santa, Eli and Eddy rush back to the North Pole and reach the main crystal just in time. Paws returns to life as a full-grown dog named Santa Paws and the holiday is saved.

Back in New York, James and Kate return Quinn and Will to the orphanage who decide to adopt them and have the family they always wanted. much to the girls joy. At the North Pole, Haggis, Rasta and T-Money stow away in a mail truck and become official elf dogs. 

Gus brings the money he received while he worked as a charity Santa to the orphanage. A grateful Mrs. Gibson invites Gus to spend the holiday with them at the orphanage. Santa Paws and Santa reunite with Quinn, Will, James and Kate on Christmas Eve, returning Quinn's late mother's angel ornament to her and putting the angel ornament on the tree before continuing their deliveries. Mr. Stewart returns the next day and James and Kate tell him that they ran the store profitably, and they decide to keep the store and continue the Hucklebuckle legacy after introducing him to the girls Mr. Stewart leaves. He then speaks to Mr. Hucklebuckle's spirit, wishing him a Merry Christmas and that his wish has been fulfilled.

Cast
 Kaitlyn Maher as Quinn Hucklebuckle, an orphaned girl who believes in the true spirit of Christmas; after her parents died, she is sent to an orphanage in New York City. She finds Paws in the alley behind the orphanage. She owns an angel ornament that was given to her by her late mother. She, alongside Will, is later adopted by James and Kate.
 Madison Pettis as Willamina "Will" Hucklebuckle, the oldest girl in the orphanage who serves as an older sister figure to Quinn. After her parents died when she was young, she lost her Christmas spirit as well as its true meaning until she is locked in the basement with Paws. She often gets the full blame for Quinn and all the other girls’ behavior due to her being the oldest. She, alongside Quinn, is later adopted by James and Kate.
 Richard Riehle as Santa Claus.
 Danny Woodburn as Eli, Santa's head elf.
 Wendi McLendon-Covey as Ms. Gladys Stout, the greedy and child-hating owner of the orphanage and the main villain of the film. She finds Christmas, toys and anything that children love offensive. Will is her main target to place blame on for everything that the other girls do due to her being the oldest. She is eventually fired and evicted from the orphanage after her abusive treatment of the girls was confirmed by Mrs. Gibson, the social worker.
 John Ducey as James Hucklebuckle, Kate's husband and grandson of the late Mr. Hucklebuckle.
 Bonnie Somerville as Kate Hucklebuckle, James' open-minded wife. 
 Chris Coppola as Augustus "Gus", a poor homeless man who takes Santa's magic crystal, unaware of its power.
 Jonathan Morgan Heit as Jimmy, a boy scout who helps search for Santa.
 G Hannelius as Janie, Will’s best friend in the orphanage.
 Michelle Creber as Taylor, an orphan.
 Kathryn Kirkpatrick as Mrs. Gibson, a kind CPS social services woman who takes over the orphanage after Ms. Stout is fired.
 Melody B. Choi as Mary, an orphan.
 Nicole Leduc as Meg, an orphan.
 Patrika Darbo as Mrs. Claus.
 Peter Gardner as Franklin, Ms. Stout's boyfriend who works as a dogcatcher.
 Bill Cobbs as Mr. Stewart, James and Kate's caseworker who says they must successfully run Hucklebuckle toys profitability for one Christmas season.

Voice cast
 Zachary Gordon as Paws, a young Great Pyrenees who is Santa’s dog and best friend.
Mitchel Musso as Santa Paws.
 Richard Kind as Eddy, a happy-go-lucky Jack Russell Terrier who is Eli's assistant.
 Jason Connery as Haggis, a Scottish Terrier who's "always ready to take action", befriends Paws and is looking to get off Santa's Naughty List.
 Christopher Massey as Rasta, a reggae Puli who is "laidback" and "easygoing", befriends Paws and is looking to get off Santa's Naughty List.
 Josh Flitter as T-Money, a streetwise hip-hop Bulldog who is "super cool", befriends Paws and is looking to get off Santa's Naughty List.
 Diedrich Bader as Comet, one of Santa's reindeer.
 Michael Deyermond as Dancer, another one of Santa's reindeer.

Reception
Angela Walker, writing for ChristianCinema.com, gave the DVD 3 stars out of 5, but said that the film fits the normal Disney DVD formula. However she went on to say that the film was predictable and clichéd, but that kids would enjoy it and that the film adds to the "spirit of Christmas."

Sequel
A sequel, Santa Paws 2: The Santa Pups was released on November 20, 2012.

See also 
 List of Christmas films
 Santa Claus in film
 Santa Paws

References

External links
 
 

Canadian direct-to-video films
2010 direct-to-video films
2010s fantasy adventure films
American direct-to-video films
2010s English-language films
American children's adventure films
American Christmas films
Canadian Christmas films
Children's Christmas films
Direct-to-video prequel films
Disney direct-to-video films
Fictional dogs
Films about dogs
Films directed by Robert Vince
Films set in New York City
Films shot in New York City
Film spin-offs
Air Bud (series)
2010s Christmas films
English-language Canadian films
2010 films
2010s Canadian films
Canadian children's adventure films
2010s American films
Santa Claus in film
American children's fantasy films
Canadian children's fantasy films